Rautovo is a village situated in Niška Banja municipality in Serbia.

It has an estimated population of 12 people.

References

Populated places in Nišava District